Air Force One is the call sign for any U.S. Air Force aircraft carrying the President of the United States.

Air Force One may also refer to:
 Boeing VC-25, the current Boeing 747-based Air Force One
 Air Force One (film)
 Air Force 1 (shoe), an athletic shoe made by Nike
 "Air Force Ones" (song), a 2002 hip hop song by Nelly
 Japanese Air Force One

See also
 First Air Force (1AF), a USAF numbered air force
Air transports of heads of state and government
Bearforce 1, European band with a play on the Air Force 1 name